Bonanza is an unincorporated community in Caldwell County, in the U.S. state of Missouri.

History
A post office called Bonanza was established in 1881, and remained in operation until 1903. Bonanza is a name derived from the Spanish language.

References

Unincorporated communities in Caldwell County, Missouri
1881 establishments in Missouri
Populated places established in 1881
Unincorporated communities in Missouri